Begonia bowerae, the eyelash begonia, is a species of flowering plant in the family Begoniaceae, native to Oaxaca and Chiapas states of Mexico. A popular houseplant, a number of cultivars are available.

References

bowerae
House plants
Endemic flora of Mexico
Flora of Chiapas
Flora of Oaxaca
Plants described in 1950